Kommissarin Lucas is a German series of telefilms set in Regensburg, Bavaria, in southeastern Germany. It streams in some English-language countries as "Detective Ellen Lucas." The series had starred Ulrike Kriener in the title role of Ellen Lucas, Chief Detective Commissioner and Michael Roll as Boris Noethen, First Commissioner. ZDF has been broadcasting the series since March 1, 2003. Each of the episodes are feature length and consequently only two to three are shown per year. Kriener won a Bavarian TV Award in 2005 for her work in this series.

See also
List of German television series

References

External links
 

German crime television series
2003 German television series debuts
2010s German television series
German-language television shows
ZDF original programming

2000s German police procedural television series
2010s German police procedural television series
2020s German police procedural television series